This list of sequence alignment software is a compilation of software tools and web portals used in pairwise sequence alignment and multiple sequence alignment. See structural alignment software for structural alignment of proteins.

Database search only

*Sequence type: protein or nucleotide

Pairwise alignment

*Sequence type: protein or nucleotide **Alignment type: local or global

Multiple sequence alignment

*Sequence type: protein or nucleotide. **Alignment type: local or global

Genomics analysis

*Sequence type: protein or nucleotide

Motif finding

*Sequence type: protein or nucleotide

Benchmarking

Alignment viewers, editors
Please see List of alignment visualization software.

Short-read sequence alignment

See also
 List of open source bioinformatics software

References

Sequence
Sequence alignment software